Comacmaeops parva is the species of the Lepturinae subfamily in long-horned beetle family. This beetle is distributed in Mexico.

References

Lepturinae
Beetles described in 1972
Taxa named by Earle Gorton Linsley